Nat Vazer is an Australian singer-songwriter from Melbourne.  Her debut album (LP), Is This Offensive and Loud?, was released in 2020 on Hotel Motel Records and was nominated for the 2020 Australian Music Prize. Vazer was nominated Best Breakthrough Act at the 2020 Music Victoria Awards.

Early life 
Nat Vazer was born in Melbourne, Australia in the State of Victoria, Australia.  She is the daughter of Vietnamese and Malaysian immigrants.  Vazer attended Wantirna College in Melbourne where she graduated as Dux and studied classical music at the Melbourne Conservatorium of Music.  She wrote her debut album in 2018 while travelling around the outskirts of Toronto.

Music career

Vazer has been described by the magazine WithGuitars as "a warm, charismatic, and contemplative singer songwriter with a penchant for writing charmingly rebellious tunes about the ironies of everyday life". Known to defy stereotypes, Vazer's music joins precise guitar melodies with "grungy yet blissful" vocals in "a mix of edgy, light and bubbly".

"Keep Away from Parks" was Vazer's first single, released in January 2018 and written in reaction to an incident in which a police officer told her not go out at night nor without a man. Her next single, the dream pop song "You're Winning Me Over", with a jangly guitar riff, is about reforming a relationship, and it was released in June. This was followed in September by "Struggletown", a song addressing destructive modern behavior in a 9-to-5 environment, yet with an easygoing melody and more of a jazz or doo-wop feel (compared to her normal indie pop/pop rock genre). Reviewing "Struggletown", James Alvarez of Get Some magazine praised Vazer's "haunting voice and an uncanny ear for Beach Boys melodies".

Vazer's debut extended play, We Used to Have Real Conversations, was released 21 September 2018, containing the three preceding singles and also the songs "Privilege", "Restless", and "Summer Holiday". "Privilege", about coming to awareness of white privilege, was itself released as a single in November and is inspired by the series Dear White People and the diaries of Kurt Cobain. , Vazer is signed to the Melbourne record label Hotel Motel.

On 29 May 2020, Vazer released her debut LP Is This Offensive and Loud?, on Hotel Motel Records. The album was named in several best-albums-the-year lists including NME Australia and The Music and was nominated for the Australian Music Prize 2020.  A limited edition cassette of the LP was also released on 30 October 2020 on Perpetual Doom Records based in Philadelphia.

Discography

Albums

EPs

Awards and nominations

Music Victoria Awards

Australian Music Prize

References

External links
 
 Nat Vazer at Triple J Unearthed website

Living people
21st-century Australian women singers
Australian indie pop musicians
Australian rock keyboardists
Singers from Melbourne
Australian women pop singers
Australian pianists
Australian women pianists
Year of birth missing (living people)
21st-century women pianists